Toulon XIII Metropole Marlins are French rugby league side based in Toulon, in the region of Provence-Alpes-Cote-d'Azur. The club plays in the Elite Two Championship, which is the 2nd tier in France. Founded in 2011, their home matches are currently played at the Stade Delaune.

History 
Founded on 16 July 2011 by Walid Kadir, Sporting Treiziste Toulonnais played their first match on 18 September 2011 against Marseille XIII Avenir at the Stade Jean Alex-Fernandez in Toulon winning 40-24. That first season in National Division 2 saw the club finish a respectful 5th. The following season 2012/13 they finished second behind Saint-Martin XIII and were promoted. They lasted just one season in National Division 1, losing their only to that date coach, former French international player Gael Tallec, who resigned. 2014/15 they bounced back immediately and were promoted back to National Division 1 as champions. This time they stayed up finishing 6th. In 2017 they beat US Trentels XIII 28-24 to lift the Paul Dejean Cup. They were promoted to the Elite Two Championship for the 2018-19 season.

Stadium 
Despite their short history Toulonnais have already used three stadiums. From 2011-2013 they played at Stade Jean Alex-Fernandez. They are based at Stade Leo-Lagrange and Stade Delaune.

Current squad
2022-23 Season

Honours 
 National Division 2 (1): 2014-15
 Paul Dejean Cup (1): 2017

References

External links

French rugby league teams
Toulon
2011 establishments in France
Rugby clubs established in 2011